Kow or KOW may refer to:

 Kow (bull), a legendary bull in Meitei mythology of Manipur
 Ganzhou Huangjin Airport, IATA code KOW
 Ganzhou Huangjin Airport (former), IATA code KOW until replaced by new airport in 2008
 Kow Swamp, Victoria, Australia
 Kow Swamp Archaeological Site
The Kings of Wessex Academy, a school in Somerset, England
 Kowloon station (MTR), Hong Kong, MTR station code KOW
 Octanol-water partition coefficient, Kow

People with the given name
 Kow Nkensen Arkaah (1927–2001), Ghanaian politician
 Kow Otani (born 1957), Japanese composer

People with the surname
 Eric Lee Kow (1912–1961), West Indian cricket umpire
 Shih-Li Kow (born 1968), Malaysian writer

See also
 Cow (disambiguation)
 Kau (disambiguation)